T. S. Gurung (1923-1989) was a social and political worker of Darjeeling, India.

Life
Born in October 1923 at Kohima in Nagaland, Shri T. S. Gurung was educated in Guwahati and Shillong. He worked for the welfare of local population and was elected to the Rajya Sabha from West Bengal in 1986.

He was murdered in January, 1989.

1923 births
1989 deaths
Rajya Sabha members from West Bengal
Communist Party of India (Marxist) politicians from West Bengal
Gurung people